Erik De Vlaeminck (23 March 1945 − 4 December 2015) was a Belgian cyclist who became cyclo-cross world-champion seven times (in 1966, 1968, 1969, 1970, 1971, 1972, 1973), a record for male riders.

Professional career
De Vlaeminck missed 1967 only because his bike was damaged during the race. He also became Belgian champion four times (1967, 1969, 1971, 1972) at a time when there were so many good Belgian riders that the domestic championship was often harder than the world-championship.

He also performed creditably in road races, including the Tour de France. In 1969 he won the Tour of Belgium and a stage in the Tour de France.

De Vlaeminck never failed a drugs test in his racing career but was treated after it for amphetamine addiction. Many stories circulate about his supposed wild behaviour after races and after his career was over. When he returned to racing, the Belgian federation would offer him a license for only a day at a time until it saw how his life would progress. De Vlaeminck subsequently refused to speak about this period of his life.

His re-establishment was complete, however, because he became the national cyclo-cross coach and led Belgium to a dominating period of international success. He always complained, however, that while cyclo-cross brought Belgium its world championship medals, it was to road racing that the bulk of the funds were given.

Personal life
De Vlaeminck was the brother of Roger De Vlaeminck. His son Geert died, aged 26, of a heart attack in a cyclo-cross race while his father was watching.

In later life, De Vlaeminck had Parkinson's disease and Alzheimer's disease. He died on 4 December 2015 at the age of 70.

Honours 
From 2000, an annual cyclo-cross named Grand Prix Eric De Vlaeminck is organized in Heusden-Zolder,

De Vlaeminck was introduced in the UCI Cycling Hall of Fame in 2002.

Major results

Road

1968
 Stage 2 Tour de France
 1st Circuit du Tournaisis
 1st GP Union Dortmund
1969
 1st  Overall Tour of Belgium
1st Stage 1 
 1st Kampioenschap van Vlaanderen
 1st Omloop der Vlaamse Ardennen
 1st Stage 1 GP du Midi Libre
 1st Ronde van West-Vlaanderen
 1st Dwars door West-Vlaanderen
 2nd La Flèche Wallonne
 2nd Boucles de l'Aulne
 2nd GP Roeselare
 2nd Leeuwse Pijl
 3rd Gent–Wevelgem
 3rd Elfstedenronde
 3rd Omloop der Zennevallei
 3rd Renaix-Tournai-Renaix
 3rd Omloop van het Waasland
1970
 1st Ronde van West-Vlaanderen
 1st  Overall Paris–Luxembourg
 1st Grand Prix of Aargau Canton
 2nd Omloop der drie Provinciën
 3rd Elfstedenronde
 3rd La Flèche Wallonne
 3rd Overall Tour of Belgium
 3rd GP Flandria 
1971
 1st GP Flandria 
 1st Prologue Tour of Luxembourg
 1st De Panne II
 2nd Prix de St. Amands
1972
 2nd Grote Prijs Marcel Kint
1977
7th Overall Tour d'Indre-et-Loire
1st  Points classification
 1st Stage 2
 3rd E3 Harelbeke

Cyclo-cross

1963
 2nd Cyclo-cross Zonhoven
2nd Druivencross Overijse
1964
 3rd Jaarmarktcross Niel
 3rd Druivencross Overijse
1965
 1st Jaarmarktcross Niel
1st Druivencross Overijse
 1st Grand Prix du Nouvel-An
1966
 1st  UCI World CX Championships
 1st  National CX Championships
 1st Jaarmarktcross Niel
 1st Noordzeecross Middelkerke
1st Druivencross Overijse
1967
 1st Jaarmarktcross Niel
1st Druivencross Overijse
1st Cyclocross Vossem
1968
 1st  UCI World CX Championships
 1st  National CX Championships
 1st Jaarmarktcross Niel
1st Druivencross Overijse
1st Cyclocross Vossem
1st Cyclocross Asse
1st Cyclocross Berlin
1st Cyclocross Eeklo
1st Cyclocross Fribourg
1st Cyclocross Gelsenkirchen
1st Cyclocross Hannover
1st Cyclocross Rieux
1st Cyclocross Tervuren
1st Cyclocross Wetteren
1969
 1st  UCI World CX Championships
 1st Noordzeecross Middelkerke
 1st Flemish championship cyclo racing
1st Cyclocross Binningen
1st Cyclocross Erembodegem
1st Cyclocross Lucerne
1st Cyclocross Mannheim
1st Cyclocross Stuttgart
1st Cyclocross Vaprio d'Agogna
1st Cyclocross Westerburg
2nd Druivencross Overijse
2nd  Cyclocross Vossem
1970
 1st  UCI World CX Championships
 1st Duinencross Koksijde
 1st Noordzeecross Middelkerke
 1st Provincial Championship Cyclocross Waasmunster
 1st Cyclophile Aigle
1st Novate Milanese
1st Cyclocross Pieterlen
1st Cyclocross Estavayer
1st Cyclocross Heusden
1st Cyclocross Otegem
1971
 1st  UCI World CX Championships
 1st  National CX Championships
 1st Duinencross Koksijde
 1st Noordzeecross Middelkerke
1st Druivencross Overijse
 1st Cyclophile Aigle
1972
 1st  UCI World CX Championships
 1st  National CX Championships
1st Druivencross Overijse
1st Novate Milanese
1st Cyclocross Zürich
1973
 1st  UCI World CX Championships
 1st Noordzeecross Middelkerke
1st Cyclocross Valladolid
3rd Druivencross Overijse
1975
 1st Noordzeecross Middelkerke
 1st Cyclo-cross Championship of Hainaut
 2nd  National CX Championships
1976
1st Druivencross Overijse
 3rd  National CX Championships
1977
 3rd  UCI World CX Championships
 3rd  National CX Championships
1978
1st Cyclo-cross Gavere
1979
 1st Jaarmarktcross Niel

See also
List of doping cases in cycling

References

External links 

Official Tour de France results for Eric De Vlaeminck

1945 births
2015 deaths
Belgian male cyclists
Cyclo-cross cyclists
Belgian Tour de France stage winners
Doping cases in cycling
Belgian sportspeople in doping cases
UCI Cyclo-cross World Champions (men)
Belgian cyclo-cross champions
People from Eeklo
Cyclists from East Flanders